Stuart Urban (born 1958) is a British film and television director.

Early life and education 
Urban was educated at Rokeby Preparatory School, Kingston upon Thames and King's College School, Wimbledon. At the age of 13, he became the youngest director to have a film shown at the Cannes Film Festival with his short feature The Virus of War. The 30-minute film was later shown on television in various countries.

Urban later attended Balliol College, Oxford, graduating with a first class degree in Modern History.

His younger brother is the journalist Mark Urban.

Career 
Urban began writing and directing full-time in the early 1980s, working on television drama series including Bergerac for the BBC. In 1992, his one-off television film An Ungentlemanly Act, a dramatisation of the first 36 hours of the Falklands War featured Ian Richardson and Bob Peck. The production won the British Academy Television Award for Best Single Drama in 1993.

In 1993, Urban set up his own independent production company, Cyclops Vision, which has produced the majority of his work ever since. He was also one of the directors of the acclaimed and award-winning 1996 BBC drama serial Our Friends in the North, although he left the production early after disagreements with writer Peter Flannery, and one of his episodes was entirely re-shot by another director, though not before being entirely re-written by Peter Flannery – a fact generally withheld from public knowledge at the time.

Urban went on to write, produce and direct the feature films Preaching to the Perverted (1997) and Revelation (2001), both produced by Cyclops Vision and released around the world. In 2015, it was listed by The Guardian as one of the top 10 films about BDSM and fetish subject matter. His documentary film work includes the first polemical film against Western interventions, Against the War (BBC, Cyclops Vision; 1999) co-written with Harold Pinter, who also presented.

In 2006, Urban completed Tovarisch, I Am Not Dead, his full-length documentary film about his father Garri, a Jewish physician from Ukraine who escaped from both the Gulag and The Holocaust. It was released to UK cinemas in 2008, earning a number of nominations and awards, including a nomination at the British Independent Film Awards and Grierson Awards. In 2011 Urban wrote, produced and directed May I Kill U?, a black comedy feature film starring Kevin Bishop, Frances Barber and Rosemary Leach. The plot follows a cycling vigilante who starts a lethal campaign in the London riots in 2011: "a psychopath on the cycle path". The film was released in 2013.

In 2014, Urban optioned Deric Henderson's non-fiction book, Let This Be Our Secret, which he adapted as screenwriter and executive produced for Hat Trick Productions and ITV. A four-hour drama, starring James Nesbitt as double murderer Colin Howell, it was filmed in Northern Ireland in late 2015 under the title The Secret and began transmission on 29 April 2016.. Urban was nominated for a BAFTA for The Secret in the category of Best Miniseries, for the Broadcast Awards (Best Drama); it also won the Royal Television Society Northern Ireland Awards as Best Drama.

Personal life 
Urban and his wife Dana live in south-west London. They have two children.

References

Sources 
The Secret nominated at Broadcast Awards 2017
The Secret Wins Best Drama N Ireland, Royal Television Society Awards

External links 

 Official site
Official site for Tovarisch I Am Not Dead
Official site for May I Kill U?

1958 births
Living people
Alumni of Balliol College, Oxford
British Reform Jews
English film directors
English male screenwriters
English television directors
People educated at King's College School, London
People from Newport, Isle of Wight